Schistosomiasis, also known as snail fever, bilharzia, and Katayama fever, is a disease caused by parasitic flatworms called schistosomes. The urinary tract or the intestines may be infected. Symptoms include abdominal pain, diarrhea, bloody stool, or blood in the urine. Those who have been infected for a long time may experience liver damage, kidney failure, infertility, or bladder cancer. In children, it may cause poor growth and learning difficulty.

The disease is spread by contact with fresh water contaminated with the parasites. These parasites are released from infected freshwater snails. The disease is especially common among children in developing countries, as they are more likely to play in contaminated water. Other high-risk groups include farmers, fishermen, and people using unclean water during daily living. It belongs to the group of helminth infections. Diagnosis is by finding eggs of the parasite in a person's urine or stool. It can also be confirmed by finding antibodies against the disease in the blood.

Methods of preventing the disease include improving access to clean water and reducing the number of snails. In areas where the disease is common, the medication praziquantel may be given once a year to the entire group. This is done to decrease the number of people infected, and consequently, the spread of the disease. Praziquantel is also the treatment recommended by the World Health Organization for those who are known to be infected.

Schistosomiasis affected about 236.6 million people worldwide in 2019. An estimated 4,400 to 200,000 people die from it each year. The disease is most commonly found in Africa, Asia, and South America. Around 700 million people, in more than 70 countries, live in areas where the disease is common. In tropical countries, schistosomiasis is second only to malaria among parasitic diseases with the greatest economic impact. Schistosomiasis is listed as a neglected tropical disease.

Signs and symptoms

Many individuals do not experience symptoms. If symptoms do appear, they usually take 4–6 weeks from the time of infection. The first symptom of the disease may be a general feeling of illness. Within 12 hours of infection, an individual may complain of a tingling sensation or light rash, commonly referred to as "swimmer's itch", due to irritation at the point of entrance. The rash that may develop can mimic scabies and other types of rashes. Other symptoms can occur 2–10 weeks later and can include fever, aching, a cough, diarrhea, chills, or gland enlargement. These symptoms can also be related to avian schistosomiasis, which does not cause any further symptoms in humans.

The manifestations of schistosomal infection vary over time as the cercariae, and later adult worms and their eggs, migrate through the body. If eggs migrate to the brain or spinal cord, seizures, paralysis, or spinal-cord inflammation are possible.

Acute Infection
Manifestation of acute infection from schistosoma include cercarial dermatitis (hours to days) and acute schistosomiasis (2–8 weeks).

Cercarial dermatitis
The first potential reaction is an itchy, maculopapular rash that results from cercariae penetrating the skin within the first 12 hours to days of cercarial skin penetration. The first time a non-sensitized person is exposed, the rashes are usually mild with an associated prickling sensation that quickly disappear on its own since this is a type of hypersensitivity reaction. In sensitized people who have previously been infected, the rash can develop into itchy, red, raised lesions (papules) with some turning into fluid-filled lesions (vesicles). Previous infections with cercariae causes a faster developing and worse presentation of dermatitis due to the stronger immune response. The round bumps are usually one to three centimeters across. Because people living in affected areas have often been repeatedly exposed, acute reactions are more common in tourists and migrants. The rash can occur between the first few hours and a week after exposure, and they normally resolve on their own in around 7–10 days. For human schistosomiasis, a similar type of dermatitis called "swimmer's itch" can also be caused by cercariae from animal trematodes that often infect birds. Cercarial dermatitis is not contagious and can not be transmitted from person-to-person.

Symptoms may include:
 Flat, red rash
 Small red, raised pimples
 Small red blisters
 Prickling or tingling sensation, burning, itching of the skin

Scratching the rash can lead to secondary bacterial infection of the skin, thus it is important to refrain from scratching. Some common treatments for itching include corticosteroid cream, anti-itch lotion, application of cool compresses to rash, bathing in Epsom salts or baking soda, and in severe itching cases, prescription strength cream and lotions. Oral antihistamines can also help relieve the itching.

Acute schistosomiasis (Katayama fever)
Acute schistosomiasis (Katayama fever) may occur weeks or months (around 2–8 weeks) after the initial infection as a systemic reaction against migrating schistosomulae as they pass through the bloodstream through the lungs to the liver and also against the antigens of eggs. Similarly to swimmer's itch, Katayama fever is more commonly seen in people with their first infection such as migrants and tourists, and it is associated with heavy infection. It is seen, however, in native residents of China infected with S. japonicum. S. japonicum can cause acute schistosomiasis in chronically infected population, and it can lead to a more severe form of acute schistosomiasis.

Symptoms may include:
 Dry cough with changes on chest X-ray
 Fever
 Fatigue
 Muscle aches
 Headache
 Malaise
 Abdominal pain
 Diarrhea
 Enlargement of both the liver and the spleen
 Hives
Acute schistosomiasis usually self-resolves in 2–8 weeks in most cases., but a small proportion of people have persistent weight loss, diarrhea, diffuse abdominal pain, and rash.

Complications may include:
 Spinal cord inflammation (transverse myelitis) may occur if worms or eggs travel to the spinal cord during this acute phase of infection.

Treatment may include:
 Corticosteroid such as prednisone is used to alleviate the hypersensitivity reaction and reduce inflammation
 Praziquantel can be administered to kill the adult schistosomes to prevent chronic infection in addition to corticosteroid therapy. It is not effective to recent infection as it only targets the adult worms, but not the premature schistosomulae. Therefore, a repeat treatment of praziquantel several weeks after initial infection may be warranted. It is recommended to treat with praziquantel 4–6 weeks after initial exposure since it targets adult worms.

Chronic infection
In long-established disease, adult worms lay eggs that can cause inflammatory reactions. The eggs secrete proteolytic enzymes that help them migrate to the bladder and intestines to be shed. The enzymes also cause an eosinophilic inflammatory reaction when eggs get trapped in tissues or embolize to the liver, spleen, lungs, or brain. The long-term manifestations are dependent on the species of schistosome, as the adult worms of different species migrate to different areas. Many infections are mildly symptomatic, with anemia and malnutrition being common in endemic areas.

Intestinal schistosomiasis
The worms of S. mansoni and S. japonicum migrate to the veins of the gastrointestinal tract and liver. Eggs in the gut wall can lead to pain, blood in the stool, and diarrhea (especially in children). Severe disease can lead to narrowing of the colon or rectum.

In intestinal schistosomiasis, eggs become lodged in the intestinal wall during their migration from the mesenteric venules to the intestinal lumen, and the trapped eggs cause an immune system reaction called a granulomatous reaction. They mostly affect the large bowel and rectum, and involvement of the small bowel is more rare. This immune response can lead to obstruction of the colon and blood loss. The infected individual may have what appears to be a potbelly. There is a strong correlation between morbidity of intestinal schistosomiasis and the intensities of infection. In cases of light infections, symptoms may be mild and can go unrecognized. The most common species to cause intestinal schistosomiasis are S. mansoni and S. japonicum, however, S. mekongi and S. intercalatum can also cause this disease.

Symptoms may include:
 Abdominal pain and discomfort
 Loss of appetite
 Mucous diarrhea with or without gross blood
 Blood in feces that is not visibly present (fecal occult blood)
 Abdominal distention

Complications may include:
 Intestinal polyps
 Intestinal ulcers
 Iron deficient anemia
 Fistula
 Bowel strictures (narrowing of colon or rectum)
 Protein-losing enteropathy
 Partial or complete bowel obstruction
 Appendicitis (rare)
Approximately 10-50% of people living in endemic regions of S. mansoni and S. japonicum develop intestinal schistosomiasis. S. mansoni infection epidemiologically overlaps with high HIV prevalence in Sub-Saharan Africa, where gastrointestinal schistosomiasis has been linked to increased HIV transmission.

Hepatosplenic schistosomiasis 
Eggs also migrate to the liver leading to fibrosis in 4 to 8% of people with chronic infection, mainly those with long-term heavy infection.

Eggs can become lodged in the liver, leading to portal hypertension, splenomegaly, the buildup of fluid in the abdomen, and potentially life-threatening dilations or swollen areas in the esophagus or gastrointestinal tract that can tear and bleed profusely (esophageal varices). This condition can be separated into two distinct phases: inflammatory hepatic schistosomiasis (early inflammatory reaction) and chronic hepatic schistosomiasis. Most common species to cause this condition are S. mansoni, S. japonicum, and S. mekongi.

Inflammatory hepatic schistosomiasis
 This condition occurs mainly in children and adolescents due to early immune reaction to eggs trapped within the periportal and presinusoidal spaces of the liver creating numerous granulomas. Liver function is not affected, and the severity of liver and spleen enlargement is correlated to the intensity of the infection. It is characterized by an enlarged left lobe of the liver with a sharp edge and enlarged spleen with nodules. The enlargement of liver and spleen is usually mild, but in severe cases, they can enlarge to the level of the belly button and even into the pelvis.

Chronic (fibrotic) hepatic schistosomiasis
 This is a late stage liver disease that occurs mainly in young and middle-aged adults who have been chronically infected with a heavy infection and whose immune regulation of fibrosis is not functioning properly. It affects only a small proportion of people who are infected. Liver function and liver architecture are not affected unlike cirrhosis. The pathogenesis of this disease is caused by deposition of collagen and extracellular matrix proteins within the periportal space, which leads to liver portal fibrosis and enlarged fibrotic portal tracts (Symmer's pipe stem fibrosis). The periportal fibrosis physically compress the portal vein leading to portal hypertension (increased portal venous pressure), increased pressure of the splenic vein, and subsequent enlargement of the spleen. Portal hypertension can also increase the pressure in portosystemic anastomoses (vessel connections between the portal circulation and systemic circulation) leading to esophageal varices and caput medusae. These portosystemic anastomoses also allows a pathway for the eggs to travel to locations such as the lungs, spinal cord, or brain. Co-infection with hepatitis is common in regions endemic to schistosomiasis with hepatitis B or hepatitis C, and co-infection with hepatitis C is associated with more rapid liver deterioration and worse outcome. Fibrotic hepatic schistosomiasis caused by S. mansoni usually develops in around 5–15 years, while it can take less time for S. japonicum.
 Symptoms may include:
 Esophageal varices (can cause life-threatening esophageal variceal bleed)
 Ascites (end-stage)
 Caput medusae
 Enlarged spleen and liver
 Complications may include:
 Neuroschistosomiasis due to portosystemic anastomoses from portal hypertension
 Pulmonary Schistosomiasis due to portosystemic anastomoses from portal hypertension

Pulmonary schistosomiasis 
Portal hypertension secondary to hepatosplenic schistosomiasis can cause vessel connections between the portal (liver and gut) circulation and systemic circulation to develop, which creates a pathway for the eggs and worms to travel to the lungs. The eggs can be deposited around the alveolar capillary beds and causes granulomatous inflammation of the pulmonary arterioles followed by fibrosis. This leads to high blood pressure in the pulmonary circulation system (pulmonary hypertension), increased pressure in the right heart, enlargement of the pulmonary artery and right atria, and thickening of the right ventricular wall.

Symptoms of pulmonary hypertension may include:
 Shortness of breath
 Chest pain
 Feeling tired
 Fainting during physical exertion

Urogenital schistosomiasis

The worms of S. haematobium migrate to the veins around the bladder and ureters where they reproduce. S. haematobium can produce up to 3000 eggs per day, these eggs migrate from the veins to the bladder and ureter lumens, but up to 50 percent of them can become trapped in the surrounding tissues causing granulomatous inflammation, polyps formation, and ulceration of bladder, ureter, and genital tract tissues. This can lead to blood in the urine 10 to 12 weeks after infection. Over time, fibrosis can lead to obstruction of the urinary tract, hydronephrosis, and kidney failure. Bladder cancer diagnosis and mortality are generally elevated in affected areas; efforts to control schistosomiasis in Egypt have led to decreases in the bladder cancer rate. The risk of bladder cancer appears to be especially high in male smokers, perhaps due to chronic irritation of the bladder lining allowing it to be exposed to carcinogens from smoking.

In women, genitourinary disease can also include genital lesions that may lead to increased rates of HIV transmission. If lesions involve the fallopian tubes or ovaries, it may lead to infertility. If the reproductive organs in male are affected, there could be blood in the sperm.

Urinary symptoms may include:
 Blood in the urine - blood is usually seen at the end of a urine stream (most common symptom)
 Painful urination
 Increase frequency of urination
 Protein in the urine
 Secondary urinary tract infection
 Secondary kidney infection
Genital symptoms may include:
 Inflammation and ulceration of uterine cervix, vagina, or vulva
 Blood in the sperm
 Infertility in female

Kidney function is unaffected in many cases, and the lesions are reversible with proper treatment to eliminate the worms.

Neuroschistosomiasis 
Central nervous system lesions occur occasionally due to inflammation and granuloma development around eggs or worms that find their way to the brain or spinal cord through the circulatory system, and they can potentially develop irreversible scarring without proper treatment. Cerebral granulomatous disease may be caused by S. japonicum eggs in the brain during both the acute and chronic phase of the disease. Communities in China affected by S. japonicum have rates of seizures eight times higher than baseline. Cerebral granulomatous infection may also be caused by S. mansoni. In situ egg deposition following the anomalous migration of the adult worm, which appears to be the only mechanism by which Schistosoma can reach the central nervous system in people with schistosomiasis. The destructive action on the nervous tissue and the mass effect produced by a large number of eggs surrounded by multiple, large granulomas in circumscribed areas of the brain characterize the pseudotumoral form of neuroschistosomiasis and are responsible for the appearance of clinical manifestations: headache, hemiparesis, altered mental status, vertigo, visual abnormalities, seizures, and ataxia. Similarly, granulomatous lesions from S. mansoni and S. haematobium eggs in the spinal cord can lead to transverse myelitis (inflammation of the spinal cord) with flaccid paraplegia. In cases with advanced hepatosplenic and urinary schistosomiasis, the continuous embolization of eggs from the portal mesenteric system (S. mansoni) or portal mesenteric-pelvic system (S. haematobium) to the brain, results in a sparse distribution of eggs associated with scant periovular inflammatory reaction, usually with little or no clinical significance.

Spinal cord inflammation (transverse myelitis) symptoms may include:
 Paralysis of the lower extremities
 Loss of bowel or urinary control
 Loss of sensation below the level of the lesion
 Pain below the level of the lesion

Cerebral granulomatous infection symptoms may include:
 Seizures
 Headaches
 Motor impairment
 Sensory impairment
 Cerebellar symptoms
 Unsteady gait
 Inability to stand or sit without support
 Uncoordinated movements
 Scanning speech
 Irregular eye movements
Corticosteroids is used to prevent permanent neurological damage from the inflammatory response to the eggs, and sometimes anticonvulsant is needed to stop the seizures. Corticosteroid is given prior to administration of praziquantel.

Transmission and life cycle

Infected Schistosoma individuals release eggs into water via their fecal material or urine. After larvae hatch from these eggs, the larvae infect a very specific type of freshwater snail. For example, in S. haematobium and S. intercalatum it is snails of the genus Bulinus, in S. mansoni it is Biomphalaria, and in S. japonicum it is Oncomelania. The schistosome larvae undergo the next phase of their lifecycles in these snails, spending their time reproducing and developing. Once this step has been completed, the parasite leaves the snail and enters the water column. The parasite can live in the water for only 48 hours without a mammalian host. Once a host has been found, the worm enters its blood vessels. For several weeks, the worm remains in the vessels, continuing its development into its adult phase. When maturity is reached, mating occurs and eggs are produced. Eggs enter the bladder/intestine and are excreted through urine and feces and the process repeats. If the eggs do not get excreted, they can become engrained in the body tissues and cause a variety of problems such as immune reactions and organ damage. While transmission typically occurs only in countries where the freshwater snails are endemic, a case in Germany was reported where a man got schistosomiasis from an infected snail in his aquarium.

Humans encounter larvae of the schistosome parasite when they enter contaminated water while bathing, playing, swimming, washing, fishing, or walking through the water.

Life cycle 

 The excretion schistosome eggs in urine or feces depending on species
 The hatching of the eggs leading to release of the free-swimming, ciliated larvae called miracidia
 Miracidia find and penetrate the snails, which are the intermediate hosts (specific species of snails is dependent on the species of schistosoma)
 Within the snails, two successive generations of sporocysts occur
 Sporocyts gives rise to the infective free-swimming larvae with forked tails called cercariae, and they leave the snails to enter the water
 Cercariae finds the human hosts and penetrate their skin
 Upon entrance into the human hosts, cercariae lose their tails and become schistosomulae
 The schistosomulae travels to the lungs and heart via the venous circulation
 They migrate to the portal venous system of the liver where they mature into the adult form with two separate sexes
 The adult male and female are paired together, exits the liver via portal venous system, and travel to the venous systems of the intestines or bladder (species dependent) and produce eggs
 S. japonicum - superior mesenteric veins (but can also inhabit inferior mesenteric veins)
 S. mansoni - inferior mesenteric veins (but can also inhabit superior mesenteric veins)
 S. haematobium - vesicular and pelvic venous plexus of the bladder (occasionally rectal venules)
 S. intercalatum and S. guineensis - inferior mesenteric plexus (lower portion of the bowels compared to S. mansoni)
Schistosomes can live an average of 3–5 years, and the eggs can survive for more than 30 years after infection.

Other hosts 
Schistosomiasis is also a concern of cattle husbandry and mice. O-methyl-threonine is weakly effective in mouse schistosomiasis but is not in use.

Pathogenesis 
The infectious stage starts when the free-swimming larval form of the schistosome, cercariae, penetrates the human skin using their suckers, proteolytic enzymes, and tail movements; the cercariae transformed into schistosomulae by losing its tail and subsequently travels to the heart and lungs through venous system until it eventually reach the liver where it will mature into the adult form. The diseases caused by the schistomes are characterized into acute schistosomiasis and chronic schistosomiasis, and they can vary dependent on the species of schistosome.

Acute infection
 Minutes to days after initial infection:
 Cercerial dermatitis (Swimmer's itch) - swimmer's itch is caused by a localized allergic reaction at the sites of skin penetration by the cercariae causing an inflammatory reaction that is characterized by itchy red pimples and blisters.
 Few weeks to months after initial infection:
 Acute Schistosomiasis (Katayama's Fever) - the exact pathophysiology of this disease remains unknown. It has been hypothesized to be caused by a systemic immune response due to immune complex formation (Type III hypersensivity) with the foreign antigens on the migratory schistosomula and the eggs, and the subsequent deposition of these complexes on various tissues leading to activation of an autoimmune response. Acute schistosomiasis caused by S. mansoni and S. haematobium generally affect people who have been infected for the first time such as tourists visiting endemic regions. In contrast, cases of acute schistosomiasis caused by S. japonicum can occur in reinfection to population who reside in endemic regions, and they occur in higher incidences and can have worse prognosis. It was proposed that the large amount of egg antigens released by S. japonicum interact with antibodies leading to the formation of high volume of immune complexes, which cause enlargement of the lymph tissues. This sequence of events can lead to clinical manifestation of fever, enlargement of spleen and liver due to fibrosis, portal hypertension, and death.

Chronic infection

The clinical manifestations of chronic infection is mainly caused by immune reaction to the eggs entrapment within tissues resulting in granuloma formation and chronic inflammation. Adult worms live together in pairs (one male and female), sexually reproduce, and lay eggs in the veins around the intestines and bladder depending on the species, and these eggs can rupture the wall of the veins to escape to the surrounding tissues. The eggs make their way through the tissues to the intestinal or bladder lumen with help of proteolytic enzymes, however, a large amount of eggs are unable to finish their journey and remained stuck within the tissues where they can elicit an immune response. The miracidia in these eggs can then release antigens that stimulate an inflammatory immune response. The miracidia within the eggs live for around 6–8 weeks before they die and stop releasing the antigens. The granulomatous response is a cellular immune response mediated by CD4+ T cells, neutrophils, eosinophils, lymphocytes, macrophages, and monocytes, and this chronic inflammatory response elicited by the eggs can cause fibrosis, tissue destruction, and granuloma nodules that disrupt the functions of the organs involved. Th1 helper cell response is prominent releasing cytokines such as IFN-γ during the early phases of infection, and it transitions to Th2 response leading to increase in level of IgE, IL-4, and eosinophils as egg production progresses. In chronic infections, the Th2 response shifts to increasing the level of IL-10, IL-13, and IgG4, which reverses the progression of the granulomas and lead to collagen deposition at the sites of the granulomas. The specific clinical symptoms and severity of the disease this causes depends on the type of schistosome infection, duration of infection, number of eggs, and the organ at which the eggs are deposited. The amount of eggs entrapped in the tissues will continue to increase if the schistosoma are not eliminated.

Diagnosis

Identification of eggs in stools

Diagnosis of infection is confirmed by the identification of eggs in stools. Eggs of S. mansoni are about 140 by 60 µm in size and have a lateral spine. The diagnosis is improved through the use of the Kato-Katz technique, a semiquantitative stool examination technique. Other methods that can be used are enzyme-linked immunosorbent assay, circumoval precipitation test, and alkaline phosphatase immunoassay.

Microscopic identification of eggs in stool or urine is the most practical method for diagnosis. Stool examination should be performed when infection with S. mansoni or S. japonicum is suspected, and urine examination should be performed if S. haematobium is suspected. Eggs can be present in the stool in infections with all Schistosoma species. The examination can be performed on a simple smear (1 to 2 mg of fecal material). Because eggs may be passed intermittently or in small numbers, their detection is enhanced by repeated examinations or concentration procedures, or both. In addition, for field surveys and investigational purposes, the egg output can be quantified by using the Kato-Katz technique (20 to 50 mg of fecal material) or the Ritchie technique. Eggs can be found in the urine in infections with S. haematobium (recommended time for collection: between noon and 3 PM) and with S. japonicum. Quantification is possible by using filtration through a nucleopore filter membrane of a standard volume of urine followed by egg counts on the membrane. Tissue biopsy (rectal biopsy for all species and biopsy of the bladder for S. haematobium) may demonstrate eggs when stool or urine examinations are negative.

Identification of microhematuria in urine using urine reagent strips is more accurate than circulating antigen tests in the identification of active schistosomiasis in endemic areas.

Antibody detection

Antibody detection can be useful to indicate schistosome infection in people who have traveled to areas where schistosomiasis is common and in whom eggs cannot be demonstrated in fecal or urine specimens. Test sensitivity and specificity vary widely among the many tests reported for the serologic diagnosis of schistosomiasis and are dependent on both the type of antigen preparations used (crude, purified, adult worm, egg, cercarial) and the test procedure.

At the U.S. Centers for Disease Control and Prevention, a combination of tests with purified adult worm antigens is used for antibody detection. All serum specimens are tested by FAST-ELISA using S. mansoni adult microsomal antigen. A positive reaction (greater than 9 units/µl serum) indicates infection with Schistosoma species. Sensitivity for S. mansoni infection is 99%, 95% for S. haematobium infection, and less than 50% for S. japonicum infection. Specificity of this assay for detecting schistosome infection is 99%. Because test sensitivity with the FAST-ELISA is reduced for species other than S. mansoni, immunoblots of the species appropriate to the person's travel history are also tested to ensure detection of S. haematobium and S. japonicum infections. Immunoblots with adult worm microsomal antigens are species-specific, so a positive reaction indicates the infecting species. The presence of antibody is indicative only of schistosome infection at some time and cannot be correlated with clinical status, worm burden, egg production, or prognosis. Where a person has traveled can help determine which Schistosoma species to test for by immunoblot.

In 2005, a field evaluation of a novel handheld microscope was undertaken in Uganda for the diagnosis of intestinal schistosomiasis by a team led by Russell Stothard from the Natural History Museum of London, working with the Schistosomiasis Control Initiative, London.

Molecular diagnostics
Polymerase chain reaction (PCR) based testing is accurate and rapid. However, it is not frequently used in countries where the disease is common due to the cost of the equipment and the technical expertise required to run the tests. Using a microscope to detect eggs costs about US$0.40 per test whereas PCR is about $US 7 per test as of 2019. Loop-mediated isothermal amplification are being studied as they are lower cost. LAMP testing is not commercially available as of 2019.

Laboratory testing 
S. haematobium screening in the community can be done by using urine dip-stick to check for hematuria, and the stool guaiac test can be used to test for blood in the stool for potential S. mansoni and S. japonicum infection. For travelers or migrants in endemic regions, complete blood count with differential can be used to identify a high level of eosinophil in the blood, which could be indicative of an acute infection. Liver function test can be ordered if hepatosplenic schistosomiasis is suspected, and a subsequent hepatitis test panel can be ordered if liver function test is abnormal.

Tissue biopsy 
If other diagnostic methods of schistosomiasis have failed to detect the infection, but there is still a high suspicion for schistosomiasis, tissue biopsy from the rectum, bladder, and liver can be obtained to look for schistosome eggs within the tissue samples.

Imaging 
Imaging modalities such as X-rays, ultrasound, computed tomography (CT), and magnetic resonance imaging (MRI) can be utilized to evaluate for severity of schistosomiasis and damages of the infected organs. For example, X-ray and CT scans of the chest can be used to detect lesions in the lungs from pulmonary schistosomiasis, and pelvic X-ray can reveal calcification of the bladder in chronic urinary schistosomiasis. Ultrasound may be used to look for abnormalities in the liver and spleen in hepatosplenic schistosomiasis, and CT scan of the liver is a good tool to look for calcification in the liver associated with S. japonicum infection. CT scan can also be used to assess damages from the schistosomiasis infection in the intestinal, urogenital, and central nervous system. MRI is used to evaluate schistosomiasis of the central nervous system, liver, and genital.

PET/CT scan that identifies tissues with higher metabolic activity have been used to help diagnose schistosomiasis in rare cases. This is due to the high level of inflammation caused by the schistosomal eggs, which increases the metabolic rate of the surrounding tissues.

Prevention

Many countries are working towards eradicating the disease. The World Health Organization is promoting these efforts. In some cases, urbanization, pollution, and the consequent destruction of snail habitat have reduced exposure, with a subsequent decrease in new infections. The elimination of snail populations using molluscicides had been attempted to prevent schistosomiasis in the past, but it was an expensive process that often only reduce but not eliminate the snail population. The drug praziquantel is used for prevention in high-risk populations living in areas where the disease is common. The Centers for Disease Control and Prevention advises avoiding drinking or coming into contact with contaminated water in areas where schistosomiasis is common.

A 2014 review found tentative evidence that increasing access to clean water and sanitation reduces schistosome infection.

Other important preventive measures include hygiene education leading to behavioral change and sanitary engineering to ensure safe water supply.

Preventive chemotherapy 
For schistosomiasis control, World Health Organization recommends preventive chemotherapy, which is treatment of entire affected population and periodic treatment of all groups at high-risk at acquiring schistosomiasis with use of Praziquantel. In 2019, 44.5% of people with schistosomiasis was treated globally, and 67.2% of school-aged children needed preventive chemotherapy received treatment.

Snails, dams, and prawns
For many years from the 1950s onwards, vast dams and irrigation schemes were constructed, causing a massive rise in water-borne infections from schistosomiasis. The detailed specifications laid out in various United Nations documents since the 1950s could have minimized this problem. Irrigation schemes can be designed to make it hard for the snails to colonize the water and to reduce the contact with the local population. Even though guidelines on how to design these schemes to minimise the spread of the disease had been published years before, the designers were unaware of them. The dams appear to have reduced the population of the large migratory prawn Macrobrachium, which eats the snails. After the construction of fourteen large dams, greater increases in schistosomiasis occurred in the historical habitats of native prawns than in other areas. Further, at the 1986 Diama Dam on the Senegal River, restoring prawns upstream of the dam reduced both snail density and the human schistosomiasis reinfection rate.

Integrated strategy in China
In China, the national strategy for schistosomiasis control has shifted three times since it was first initiated: transmission control strategy (from mid-1950s to early 1980s), morbidity control strategy (from mid-1980s to 2003), and the "new integrated strategy" (2004 to present). The morbidity control strategy focused on synchronous chemotherapy for humans and bovines and the new strategy developed in 2004 intervenes in the transmission pathway of schistosomiasis, mainly including replacement of bovines with machines, prohibition of grazing cattle in the grasslands, improving sanitation, installation of fecal-matter containers on boats, praziquantel drug therapy, snail control, and health education. A 2018 review found that the "new integrated strategy" was highly effective to reduce the rate of S. japonicum infection in both humans and the intermediate host snails and reduced the infection risk by 3–4 times relative to the conventional strategy.

Treatment

Two drugs, praziquantel and oxamniquine, are available for the treatment of schistosomiasis. They are considered equivalent in relation to efficacy against S. mansoni and safety. Because of praziquantel's lower cost per treatment, and oxaminiquine's lack of efficacy against the urogenital form of the disease caused by S. haematobium, in general praziquantel is considered the first option for treatment. Praziquantel can be safely used in pregnant women and young children. The treatment objective is to cure the disease and to prevent the evolution of the acute to the chronic form of the disease. All cases of suspected schistosomiasis should be treated regardless of presentation because the adult parasite can live in the host for years.

Schistosomiasis is treatable by taking by mouth a single dose of the drug praziquantel annually.

Praziquantel only eliminates the adult schistosomes, but it is not effective in killing the eggs and immature worms. Live eggs can be excreted by the infected individuals for weeks after treatment with praziquantel. The immature worms can survive and grow up to be adult schistosomes after praziquantel therapy. Thus, it is important to have repeated schistosomiasis testing of the stool and/or urine around 4–6 weeks after praziquantel therapy. Treatment of praziquantel may be repeated to ensure complete elimination of the parasite.

The WHO has developed guidelines for community treatment based on the impact the disease has on children in villages in which it is common:
 When a village reports more than 50 per cent of children have blood in their urine, everyone in the village receives treatment.
 When 20 to 50 percent of children have bloody urine, only school-age children are treated.
 When fewer than 20 percent of children have symptoms, mass treatment is not implemented.

Other possible treatments include a combination of praziquantel with metrifonate, artesunate, or mefloquine. A Cochrane review found tentative evidence that when used alone, metrifonate was as effective as praziquantel. Mefloquine, which has previously been used to treat and prevent malaria, was recognised in 2008–2009 to be effective against schistosomes.

Historically, antimony potassium tartrate remained the treatment of choice for schistosomiasis until the development of praziquantel in the 1980s.

Post-treatment monitoring
Osteopontin (OPN)  is a promising tool for monitoring praziquantel efficacy and post-treatment fibrosis regression as (OPN) expression is modulated by S. mansoni egg antigens and its levels correlate with severity of schistosomiasis fibrosis and portal hypertension in mice and humans. Praziquantel pharmacotherapy reduces systemic OPN levels and liver collagen content in mice.

Epidemiology

The disease is found in tropical countries in Africa, the Caribbean, eastern South America, Southeast Asia, and the Middle East. S. mansoni is found in parts of South America and the Caribbean, Africa, and the Middle East; S. haematobium in Africa and the Middle East; and S. japonicum in the Far East. S. mekongi and S. intercalatum are found locally in Southeast Asia and central West Africa, respectively.

The disease is endemic in about 75 developing countries and mainly affects people living in rural agricultural and peri-urban areas.

Infection estimates
In 2010, approximately 238 million people were infected with schistosomiasis, 85 percent of whom live in Africa. An earlier estimate from 2006 had put the figure at 200 million people infected. As of the latest WHO record, 236.6 million people were infected in 2019. In many of the affected areas, schistosomiasis infects a large proportion of children under 14 years of age. An estimated 600 to 700 million people worldwide are at risk from the disease because they live in countries where the organism is common. In 2012, 249 million people were in need of treatment to prevent the disease. This likely makes it the most common parasitic infection with malaria second and causing about 207 million cases in 2013.

S. haematobium, the infectious agent responsible for urogenital schistosomiasis, infects over 112 million people annually in Sub-Saharan Africa alone. It is responsible for 32 million cases of dysuria, 10 million cases of hydronephrosis, and 150,000 deaths from kidney failure annually, making S. haematobium the world's deadliest schistosome.

Deaths
Estimates regarding the number of deaths vary. Worldwide, the Global Burden of Disease Study issued in 2010 estimated 12,000 direct deaths while the WHO in 2014 estimated more than 200,000 annual deaths related to schistosomiasis. Another 20 million have severe consequences from the disease. It is the most deadly of the neglected tropical diseases.

History
The most ancient evidence of schistosomiasis dates back to more than 6000 years ago. Studies conducted on human skeletal remains found in northern Syria (5800–4000 BC), demonstrated the evidence of a terminal spined schistosome from the pelvic sediment of skeletal remains. Even if these evidence comes from Syria, it has been suggested that the 'cradle' of schistosomes lies in the region of African Great Lakes, an area in which both the parasites and their intermediate hosts are in an active state of evolution. Subsequently, it is believed that schistosomiasis have spread to Egypt as a result of the importation of monkeys and slaves during reign of the fifth dynasty of Pharaohs (~ 2494–2345 BC).

Schistosomiasis is known as bilharzia or bilharziosis in many countries, after German physician Theodor Bilharz, who first described the cause of urinary schistosomiasis in 1851.

The first physician who described the entire disease cycle was the Brazilian parasitologist Pirajá da Silva in 1908. The earliest known case of infection was discovered in 2014, belonging to a child who lived 6,200 years ago.

It was a common cause of death for Egyptians in the Greco-Roman Period.

In 2016 more than 200 million people needed treatment but only 88 million people were actually treated for schistosomiasis.

Etymology

Schistosomiasis is named for the genus of parasitic flatworm Schistosoma, whose name means 'split body'. The name Bilharzia comes from Theodor Bilharz, a German pathologist working in Egypt in 1851 who first discovered these worms.

Society and culture
Schistosomiasis is endemic in Egypt, exacerbated by the country's dam and irrigation projects along the Nile. From the late 1950s through the early 1980s, infected villagers were treated with repeated injections of tartar emetic. Epidemiological evidence suggests that this campaign unintentionally contributed to the spread of hepatitis C via unclean needles. Egypt has the world's highest hepatitis C infection rate, and the infection rates in various regions of the country closely track the timing and intensity of the anti-schistosomiasis campaign.

From ancient times to the early 20th century, schistosomiasis' symptom of blood in the urine was seen as a male version of menstruation in Egypt and was thus viewed as a rite of passage for boys.

Among human parasitic diseases, schistosomiasis ranks second behind malaria in terms of socio-economic and public health importance in tropical and subtropical areas.

Research

A proposed vaccine against S. haematobium infection called "Bilhvax" underwent a phase 3 clinical trial among children in Senegal. The results, reported in 2018, showed that it was not effective despite provoking some immune response. Using CRISPR gene editing technology, researchers decreased the symptoms due to schistosomiasis in an animal model.

See also 
 Angiostrongyliasis, another disease transmitted by snails

References

External links 

 
 River of Hope — documentary about the rise of schistosomiasis along the Senegal river (video, 47 mins)
 Schistosomiasis information for travellers from IAMAT (International Association for Medical Assistance to Travellers)
  by Facts in Motion

Waterborne diseases
Helminthiases
Zoonoses
Tropical diseases
Hepatology
Infectious causes of cancer
Wikipedia medicine articles ready to translate
Wikipedia infectious disease articles ready to translate